Central Northeast, also sometimes called Mahaning Heights, is a small neighborhood located in Northeast Washington, D.C. with Fort Mahan Park at its center. It is bounded by Nannie Helen Burroughs Avenue to the north, Benning Road to the south, the tracks of the Washington Metro and Minnesota Ave station to the west, and 44th Street NE to the east.

It is home to the Friendship Collegiate Academy, a public charter high school.

This neighborhood is part of Ward 7.

External links 
National Park Service: Civil War History of Fort Mahan
Friendship Schools: Friendship Collegiate Academy

Neighborhoods in Northeast (Washington, D.C.)